Joseph Robert Boles (5 March 1880 – 8 August 1950) was an Australian rules footballer who played with South Melbourne in the Victorian Football League (VFL).

Notes

External links 

1880 births
1950 deaths
Australian rules footballers from Victoria (Australia)
Sydney Swans players